First Oil Well may refer to:

 Village Bóbrka, near Krosno, Poland, is the site of the very first oil well (1854).  Polish inventor Jan Józef Ignacy Łukasiewicz designed the machines.
 Oil Springs, Ontario, the world's first commercial oil well (1858).
 Drake Well Museum, site of the American first successful oil well in Titusville, Pennsylvania (1859).
 First Oil Well, Bahrain, the first oil well in the Persian Gulf (1932).